Nails Creek is a stream in the U.S. state of Georgia. It is a tributary to the Hudson River. Variant names are "Nail Creek" and "Nealls Creek".

See also
Cromer's Mill Covered Bridge

References

Rivers of Georgia (U.S. state)
Rivers of Banks County, Georgia
Rivers of Franklin County, Georgia
Rivers of Madison County, Georgia